Cyrille Ndayirukiye (8 July 1954 – 25 April 2021) was a Burundian politician and Army general. He served as Minister of National Defence of Burundi from 2000 to 2002. He was also one of the main anti-government militants in the 2015 coup attempt.

As one of the main soldiers involved in the 2015 coup attempt in Burundi, he was consequently sentenced to Life imprisonment in January 2016. Ndayirukiye has died in prison on April 21, 2021.

References

1954 births
2021 deaths
Burundian politicians
Burundian criminals
Burundian military personnel
Burundian Defense Minister
People from Muramvya Province